Rooftop Sessions is the first album by The Last Wish. It was released on cassette tape in 1993 in Houston, Texas. The song "Mountain" was one of the first song ever written by Justin Furstenfeld of Blue October and is a staple at Justin's solo concerts.

Track listing
"Never Dreams"
"Misti Blue"
"Circle of 11"
"One More Time"
"Soul Bruised"
"Don't Care"
"Mountain"
"Softly Kill Me"
"Goodbye"
"You"
"Rooftops"

The Last Wish (band) albums
1993 albums

References